The 1957 Northwestern Wildcats team represented Northwestern University during the 1957 Big Ten Conference football season. In their second year under head coach Ara Parseghian, the Wildcats compiled a 0–9 record (0–7 against Big Ten Conference opponents), finished in last place in the Big Ten, and were outscored by their opponents by a combined total of 271 to 57.

Schedule

References

Northwestern Wildcats
Northwestern Wildcats football seasons
College football winless seasons
Northwestern Wildcats football